Panrui is a village in Sainthia and a community development block in the Suri Sadar subdivision of the Birbhum district, West Bengal, India. It is also  from Siuri, the sadar town of Birbhum district. It has a population of 1,146.

Geography

Police station
The Panrui police station has jurisdiction over the Suri II community development block.

Demographics
According to the 2011 Census of India, Panrui had a total population of 923 people, 478 (52%) of which were males and 445 (48%) were females. There were 114 persons under the age of six. The total number of literate people in Panrui was 632 (78.12% of the population over 6 years).

References

Villages in Birbhum district